Mahua Maji is an  Indian politician and a member of the Rajya Sabha, upper house of the Parliament of India from Jharkhand as a member of the Jharkhand Mukti Morcha. Women's commission chairman is Mahua Maji.

References

Jharkhand Mukti Morcha politicians
Living people
Year of birth missing (living people)
Rajya Sabha members from Jharkhand